Angelo Dolfini (born 8 October 1978 in Pavia) is an Italian former competitive figure skater. He is a four-time Italian national champion (1999–2002) and competed at the 2002 Winter Olympics, placing 26th. He was coached by Petra Ruhrmann from childhood until the end of his competitive career.

Dolfini studied literature at the University of Pavia. He is an International Technical Specialist for Italy.

Programs

Results 
GP: Grand Prix; JGP: Junior Series (Junior Grand Prix)

References

External links
 

Italian male single skaters
Olympic figure skaters of Italy
Figure skaters at the 2002 Winter Olympics
1978 births
Living people
International Skating Union technical specialists
Competitors at the 2001 Winter Universiade